Capella is a bright star in the constellation of Auriga.

Capella may also refer to:

Places
 Capella, Queensland, a town in the Central Highlands Region, Australia
 Capella, Aragon, a municipality in Huesca, Spain
 Capella Island, a minor island of the U.S. Virgin Islands

Other uses
 Capella (crater), an impact crater on the Moon
 Capella (engineering), an open-source engineering solution
 Capella (music), a musical ensemble
 Capella (notation program), a program by capella Software AG
 Mazda Capella, a model of automobile
 USS Capella, a cargo ship of the United States Navy
 Capella (concrete ship), a concrete ship built in World War II.
 Capella Aircraft, an American aircraft manufacturer
 Capella University, an online academic institution based in Minneapolis, Minnesota
 Gallinago or Capella, a genus of snipes
 Capella Resort, Singapore, a hotel in Singapore

People with the name
 Martianus Capella, writer and astronomer of late antiquity
 Tom Capella, American politician

See also
 A cappella (disambiguation)
 Capela (disambiguation)
 Cappella (disambiguation)
 Capelle (disambiguation)
 Kapella (disambiguation)